Midway Peak is a  mountain summit located on the Continental Divide, on the shared border of Alberta and British Columbia in the Canadian Rockies. It is also on the shared border between Banff National Park and Yoho National Park and can be seen from the Icefields Parkway. It was named in 1918 by Arthur O. Wheeler.

Geology

Midway Peak is composed of sedimentary rock laid down during the Precambrian to Jurassic periods. Formed in shallow seas, this sedimentary rock was pushed east and over the top of younger rock during the Laramide orogeny.

Climate

Based on the Köppen climate classification, Midway Peak is located in a subarctic climate with cold, snowy winters, and mild summers. Temperatures can drop below −20 °C with wind chill factors below −30 °C. Precipitation runoff from the peak drains east to the Mistaya River, or west into tributaries of the Blaeberry River.

See also
 List of peaks on the Alberta–British Columbia border
 Mountains of Alberta
 Mountains of British Columbia

References

Midway Peak
Midway Peak
Canadian Rockies